Katlyn Chookagian (born December 28, 1988) is an American professional mixed martial artist. She has formerly competed in the Bantamweight division and currently competes in the Flyweight division in the Ultimate Fighting Championship (UFC). As of March 7, 2023, she is #6 in the UFC women's flyweight rankings.  Her dad owns The Pub and was well known for coaching Kerry's with Quakertown Little League legend, Mike Gaffney.

Early life and education
Chookagian was born in Quakertown, Pennsylvania, where she graduated from Quakertown Senior High School. 

Her first job was serving pizza at Q-Mart, and she also worked as a bartender in Hoboken, New Jersey. 

Chookagian started training karate when she was four years old, started fighting as an amateur in mixed martial arts (MMA) in 2012, and became a professional in 2014. Her teammates and training partners include Gordon Ryan, Claudia Gadelha, Sijara Eubanks, and the team captain Frankie Edgar. Chookagian holds a bachelor's degree in business management and marketing from Fairleigh Dickinson University. She is of Armenian descent.

Career

Mixed martial arts career
After going 7–0 as an amateur, Chookagian made her professional mixed martial arts debut against Rebecca Heintzman on June 28, 2014, at CFFC 37. She won the fight via unanimous decision.

Chookagian made her second professional fight at World Series of Fighting 13: Moraes vs. Bollinger on September 13, 2014. Katlyn Chookagian secured a knockout triumph against 44-year-old Brigitte Narcise at 38 seconds of the final round in the flyweight category.

Chookagian had her two subsequent bouts canceled. Against Allanna Jones in the Ring of Combat 49, and against Nohime Dennison at CFFC 45. Finally, on May 9, 2015, she fought twice in the same day, beating Linn Wennergren by unanimous decision, and Melinda Fábián by submission in the first round.

She returned to the event where she made her debut, the CFFC, and held three more fights there. The results continued great: two belts, two victories by unanimous decision and one by knockout, due to a knee.

Chookagian debuted in the UFC on July 13, 2016, at UFC Fight Night: McDonald vs. Lineker against Lauren Murphy. She won the fight via unanimous decision.

Chookagian next fought Liz Carmouche at UFC 205. She lost the bout via split decision.

Chookagian faced  Irene Aldana at UFC 210 on April 8, 2017. She won the fight by  decision.

Chookagian faced Mara Romero Borella on January 27, 2018, at UFC on Fox: Jacaré vs. Brunson 2. She won the fight via unanimous decision.

Chookagian faced Alexis Davis on July 28, 2018, at UFC on Fox 30. She won the fight by unanimous decision.

Chookagian faced Jessica Eye on December 8, 2018, at UFC 231. She lost the fight by split decision.

Chookagian faced Joanne Calderwood on June 8, 2019, at UFC 238. She won the fight by unanimous decision.

Chookagian faced Jennifer Maia on November 2, 2019, at UFC 244. At the weigh-ins, Maia weighted at 127.2 pounds, 1.2 pounds over the flyweight non-title fight limit of 126. The bout proceed at catchweight and Maia was fined 25% of her purse and went to Chookagian. She won the fight via unanimous decision.

Chookagian faced Valentina Shevchenko for the UFC Flyweight Champion on February 8, 2020, at UFC 247. She lost the bout via technical knockout in round three.

Chookagian faced Antonina Shevchenko May 30, 2020 at UFC on ESPN: Woodley vs. Burns. After dominating Shevchenko on the ground throughout the bout, Chookagian won the fight via unanimous decision.

Chookagian faced Jéssica Andrade on October 18, 2020 at UFC Fight Night 180. She lost the fight via technical knockout in round one.

Chookagian faced Cynthia Calvillo on November 21, 2020, at UFC 255. She won the fight via unanimous decision.

Chookagian faced Viviane Araújo on May 15, 2021, at UFC 262. She won the bout via unanimous decision.

Chookagian faced Jennifer Maia on January 15, 2022, at UFC on ESPN 32. She won the fight via unanimous decision. Despite winning three fights in a row, it was reported on January 16 that the bout with Jennifer Maia was the last fight on her contract. In a post-fight interview, Chookagian claimed that the UFC declined to negotiate a new contract with her prior to the Jennifer Maia bout, making her a free agent.

As the first bout of her new contract, Chookagian faced Amanda Ribas on May 14, 2022 at UFC on ESPN 36. She won the back-and-forth fight by split decision. The win also earned Chookagian her first Fight of the Night bonus award.

Chookagian was scheduled to face Manon Fiorot on September 3, 2022, at UFC Fight Night 209. However, Chookagian withdrew due to unknown reasons in mid June and was replaced by former UFC Women's Strawweight Champion Jéssica Andrade. In turn, Andrade withdrew in mid-July due to undisclosed reasons and was replaced by Fiorot's original opponent: Chookagian. After Fiorot injured her knee, the bout was eventually shifted to take place at UFC 280 on October 22, 2022. At the weigh-ins, Chookagian weighed in at 127.5 pounds, 1.5 pounds over the flyweight non-title fight limit. Chookagian was fined 20% of her purse, which will go to her opponent  Fiorot. She lost the fight by unanimous decision.

Championships and accomplishments
Ultimate Fighting Championship
Most unanimous decision wins in UFC Women's Flyweight division history (8) 
Tied (Valentina Shevchenko) for most wins in UFC Women's Flyweight division history (9)
Most significant strikes landed in UFC Women's Flyweight division history (790)
Longest total fight time in UFC Women's Flyweight division history (3:00:58)
Tied (Gillian Robertson) for most fights in UFC Women's Flyweight division history (13)
Tied for sixth most unanimous decision wins in UFC history (9)
 Highest decision wins per win percentage in UFC history  (11 decision wins / 11 wins: 100%)
Fight of the Night (One time) 
Cage Fury Fighting Championships
CFFC Woman’s Flyweight Champion (One time)
CFFC Woman’s Bantamweight Champion (One time)

Mixed martial arts record

|-
|Loss
|align=center|18–5
|Manon Fiorot
|Decision (unanimous)
|UFC 280
|
|align=center|3
|align=center|5:00
|Abu Dhabi, United Arab Emirates
|
|-
|Win
|align=center|18–4
|Amanda Ribas 
|Decision (split)
|UFC on ESPN: Błachowicz vs. Rakić 
| 
|align=center|3
|align=center|5:00
|Las Vegas, Nevada, United States
|
|-
|Win
|align=center|17–4
|Jennifer Maia
|Decision (unanimous)
|UFC on ESPN: Kattar vs. Chikadze
|
|align=center|3
|align=center|5:00
|Las Vegas, Nevada, United States
|
|-
|Win
|align=center|16–4
|Viviane Araújo
|Decision (unanimous)
|UFC 262 
|
|align=center|3
|align=center|5:00
|Houston, Texas, United States
|
|-
|Win
|align=center|15–4
|Cynthia Calvillo 
|Decision (unanimous)
|UFC 255
|
|align=center|3
|align=center|5:00
|Las Vegas, Nevada, United States
|
|-
|Loss
|align=center|14–4
|Jéssica Andrade
|TKO (body punches)
|UFC Fight Night: Ortega vs. The Korean Zombie
|
|align=center|1
|align=center|4:55
|Abu Dhabi, United Arab Emirates
|
|-
|Win
|align=center|14–3
|Antonina Shevchenko
|Decision (unanimous)
|UFC on ESPN: Woodley vs. Burns
|
|align=center|3
|align=center|5:00
|Las Vegas, Nevada, United States
|
|-
|Loss
|align=center|13–3
|Valentina Shevchenko
|TKO (elbows and punches)
|UFC 247 
|
|align=center|3
|align=center|1:03
|Houston, Texas, United States
|
|-
|Win
|align=center|13–2
|Jennifer Maia
|Decision (unanimous)
|UFC 244 
|
|align=center|3
|align=center|5:00
|New York City, New York, United States
|
|-
|Win
|align=center|12–2
|Joanne Calderwood
|Decision (unanimous)
|UFC 238 
|
|align=center|3
|align=center|5:00
|Chicago, Illinois, United States
|
|-
|Loss
|align=center|11–2
|Jessica Eye
|Decision (split)
|UFC 231 
|
|align=center|3
|align=center|5:00
|Toronto, Ontario, Canada
|  
|-
|Win
|align=center|11–1
|Alexis Davis
|Decision (unanimous)
|UFC on Fox: Alvarez vs. Poirier 2 
|
|align=center|3
|align=center|5:00
|Calgary, Alberta, Canada
|
|-
|Win
|align=center|10–1 
|Mara Romero Borella
|Decision (unanimous)
|UFC on Fox: Jacaré vs. Brunson 2 
|
|align=center|3
|align=center|5:00
|Charlotte, North Carolina, United States
|
|-
|Win
|align=center|9–1 
|Irene Aldana
|Decision (split)
|UFC 210
|
|align=center|3
|align=center|5:00
|Buffalo, New York, United States
|
|-
|Loss
|align=center|8–1 
|Liz Carmouche
| Decision (split)
|UFC 205
|
|align=center| 3
|align=center| 5:00
|New York City, New York, United States
|
|-
| Win
| align=center| 8–0
| Lauren Murphy
| Decision (unanimous)
| UFC Fight Night: McDonald vs. Lineker
| 
| align=center| 3
| align=center| 5:00
| Sioux Falls, South Dakota, United States
| 
|-
| Win
| align=center| 7–0
| Stephanie Bragayrac
| KO (knee)
| CFFC 57: Honorio vs. Gaudinot
| 
| align=center| 1
| align=center| 0:45
| Philadelphia, Pennsylvania, United States
| 
|-
| Win
| align=center| 6–0
| Isabelly Varela
| Decision (unanimous)
| CFFC 55: Chookagian vs. Varela
| 
| align=center| 5
| align=center| 5:00
| Atlantic City, New Jersey, United States
| 
|-
| Win
| align=center| 5–0
| Sijara Eubanks
| Decision (unanimous)
| CFFC 52: Horcher vs. Regman
| 
| align=center| 3
| align=center| 5:00
| Atlantic City, New Jersey, United States
| 
|-
| Win
| align=center| 4–0
| Melinda Fábián
| Submission (armbar)
| PMMAL Hungarian Fight Championship 9
| 
| align=center| 1
| align=center| 4:33
| Budapest, Hungary
| 
|-
| Win
| align=center| 3–0
| Linn Wennergren
| Decision (unanimous)
| PMMAL Hungarian Fight Championship 9
| 
| align=center| 3
| align=center| 5:00
| Budapest, Hungary
|
|- 
| Win
| align=center| 2–0
| Brigitte Narcisse
| KO (knees)
| |WSOF 13
| 
| align=center| 3
| align=center| 0:38
| Bethlehem, Pennsylvania, United States
| 
|- 
| Win
| align=center| 1–0
| Rebecca Heintzman
| Decision (unanimous)
| CFFC 37: Anyanwu vs. Bell
| 
| align=center| 3
| align=center| 5:00
| Philadelphia, Pennsylvania, United States
|

References

External links
 

1988 births
People from Quakertown, Pennsylvania
Living people
American people of Armenian descent
Bantamweight mixed martial artists
American female mixed martial artists
Mixed martial artists from Pennsylvania
Flyweight mixed martial artists
Mixed martial artists utilizing karate
Mixed martial artists utilizing Brazilian jiu-jitsu
Fairleigh Dickinson University alumni
American practitioners of Brazilian jiu-jitsu
American female karateka
Armenian female mixed martial artists
Armenian practitioners of Brazilian jiu-jitsu
Armenian female karateka
Female Brazilian jiu-jitsu practitioners
Ultimate Fighting Championship female fighters
21st-century American women